David A. Scheinberg, M.D., Ph.D. is a physician, scientist, drug developer, and entrepreneur, who is currently Vincent Astor Chair, and Chairman of the Molecular Pharmacology Program at Memorial Sloan Kettering Cancer Center (MSK). He is a pioneer and inventor of targeted alpha particle therapies and alpha particle generators for use in patients with cancer.

Career 
Scheinberg received a BA from Cornell University and an MD, PhD from Johns Hopkins University School of Medicine. He is a professor of pharmacology and co-chair of the pharmacology graduate program at Weill Cornell Graduate School of Medical Sciences and a professor at the Gerstner Sloan Kettering Graduate School. He also founded and chairs the Experimental Therapeutics Center and formerly the Nanotechnology Center at MSK. He founded and is a Director of the Tri-Institutional Therapeutics Discovery Institute of MSK, Weill Cornell Medicine, and Rockefeller Universities.

In 2013 Nature Biotechnology recognized him as one of the top 20 Translational Scientists in the world. Scheinberg has published more than 300 papers, chapters, or books and has more than 30 patents.

His laboratory studies cancer immunology, cellular engineering, cancer vaccines, T cell receptor mimic antibodies, and targeted nano-machines.

Memberships 
 American Society of Clinical Investigation (ASCI)
 Association of American Physicians (AAP)
 Interurban Clinical Club

Awards 
 Doris Duke Distinguished Clinical Science Professorship
 Lucille P. Markey Scholarship
 Emil J. Freireich Award
 Leukemia and Lymphoma Society Translational Investigator Awards
 CapCure Awards

References

External links 
 Memorial Sloan Kettering - David Scheinberg Lab
 Tri-Institutional Therapeutics Discovery Institute
 Tri-Institutional Chemical Biology PhD Program
 Gerstner Sloan Kettering

Year of birth missing (living people)
Living people
American oncologists
Johns Hopkins University alumni
Cancer researchers
Cornell University alumni